The Codex Necro is the first studio album by British extreme metal band Anaal Nathrakh. It was released on 22 November 2001.

The album was re-released on 24 April 2006, with four additional bonus tracks taken from the John Peel BBC Radio One Session broadcast on 16 December 2003. It was again re-released in 2009, with four additional bonus tracks taken from the We Will Fucking Kill You demo.

Background
The person being suffocated on the album cover is Mick Kenney's younger brother. The album features sound samples from films such as Event Horizon, Excalibur, The Legend of Hell House, Omen III: The Final Conflict and Platoon. The 2006 re-release features the first ever live performance of "The Oblivion Gene", later to appear in its full re-recorded form on the subsequent album Domine Non Es Dignus. The title "Human, All Too Fucking Human" is a reference to Friedrich Nietzsche's philosophical text Human, All Too Human (Menschliches, Allzumenschliches, 1878).

Reception

Upon its release, The Codex Necro received positive reviews and numerous "album of the month" awards from various publications, and in 2009 and 2010 appeared in several notable "albums of the decade" lists, such as the Terrorizer Critics' "Albums of the Decade", Decibel magazine's "100 Albums of the Decade", and "The Decade's Best Metal" on avclub.com.

Track listing

Personnel
 V.I.T.R.I.O.L. – vocals
 Irrumator – all instruments

Production
Anaal Nathrakh – arrangement, production, recording, engineering, audio mixing

References

2001 debut albums
Anaal Nathrakh albums
Earache Records albums